Rosanne Casimir  is the Kúkpi7 (meaning Chief) of the Tk’emlúps te Secwépemc. She is the third woman to serve as Kúkpi7. During her tenure, the remains of 215 children were found buried on the site of the former Kamloops Indian Residential School.

Career
Casimir first ran for election as Kúkpi7 in 2018. She succeeded the previous office-holder Fred Seymour, who did not seek re-election, becoming the third woman to hold the office. She had previously served as a Tk’emlups councillor for nine years, holding portfolios for land, taxation and housing. One of her ancestors is a previous Tk’emlups chief Louis Clexlixqen (1852 -1915). 

During her tenure as Kúkpi7, the remains of 215 children were found buried on the site of the former Kamloops Indian Residential School. In May 2021, according to a source referencing TteS Kukpi7 Rosanne Casimir's news release, the remains of 215 children, including some as young as three years old, were found buried on the site of the former residential school. In the press release issued by Casimir, stated that: “We are not here for retaliation. We are here for truth telling.”

In October 2021, President Justin Trudeau issued a formal apology to indigenous leaders, including Kúkpi7 Casimir, since he decided to not formally participate in Canada's first National Day for Truth and Reconciliation. This was despite having received two invitations from the Tk’emlúps te Secwépemc Nation. Casimir described his lack of attendance as a "gut punch to the community".

In November 2021, Casimir was elected for another three year term as Kúkpi7 (Chief) of the Tk’emlúps te Secwépemc. Of the 475 eligible ballots cast, 245 were in support of Casimir.

Awards and recognition
In 2022, Castanet News selected Casimir as Person of the Year 2021 and was made a Member of the Order of British Columbia. She is a member of the board of directors of the British Columbia Assembly of First Nations.

Personal life
In February 2021, Casimir and her husband both tested positive for COVID-19.

She is married and has two children and one step-child.

References

External links

 Tk'emlúps te Secwe̓pemc Kukpi7 Rosanne Casimir on Prime Minister Justin Trudeau's visit and apology (interview)
 'Shock, anger, sorrow and disbelief': Casimir on Trudeau's trip to Tofino, B.C. (speech)

Living people
Year of birth missing (living people)
Tribal chiefs
Indigenous Canadian women